Holiday at Lake Bodom (15 Years of Wasted Youth) is a compilation album by the Finnish melodic death metal band Children of Bodom, featuring one song from Something Wild, three from Hatebreeder, three from Follow the Reaper, four from Hate Crew Deathroll, four from Are You Dead Yet?, one from Blooddrunk, two from Relentless Reckless Forever, and two previously unreleased cover songs. The DVD portion of the package includes "candid touring and backstage footage from around the world", plus the music video for "Shovel Knockout". The album was released on 22 May 2012.

Track listing

Credits

Band members
Alexi Laiho – lead vocals, lead guitar
Roope Latvala – rhythm guitar and backing vocals on tracks 2, 6, 9, 10, 11, 13, 15, 17 and 18
Jaska Raatikainen – drums
Henkka Seppälä – bass, backing vocals
Janne Wirman – keyboards, synthesizer
Alexander Kuoppala - rhythm guitar and backing vocals on tracks 1, 3, 4, 5, 7, 8, 12, 14, 16, 19 and 20

Guest musicians
Pasi Rantanen - lead vocals on track 17

Charts

References

Children of Bodom albums
2012 compilation albums